The theory of a biotic pump pertains to the importance of forests in the water cycle, specifically, in determining the levels of rainfall a region will receive. It states that an increased amount of evaporation or transpiration will cause a reduction in atmospheric pressure as clouds form, which will subsequently cause moist air to be drawn to regions where evapotranspiration is at its highest. In a desert this will correspond to the sea whereas in a forest, moist air from the sea will be drawn inland. The theory predicts two different types of coast to contentinental rainfall patterns, first in a forested area one can expect no decrease in rainfall as one moves inland in contrast to a deforested region where one observes an exponential decrease in annual rainfall. While current global climate models fit these patterns well, it is argued this is due to parametrization and not the veracity of the theories.

This theory is in contradiction of the more traditional view that surface winds are solely a direct product of differences in surface heating and heat released from condensation. The creators of the theory argue that phase changes in water play a greater role in atmospheric dynamics than currently acknowledged. Publication of the paper was preceded by an extended editorial debate at the publishing journal, based on highly critical peer reviews.

The term biotic pump first appeared in a journal article in 2007 and was initially ignored and criticised. By 2022 the concept had been more widely articulated and linked to the importance of stopping deforestation, restoring the hydrological cycle and planetary cooling.

Concept 
The term “biotic pump” infers a circulation system driven by biological processes. The biotic pump concept attributes forests and other forms of vegetation for creating atmospheric dynamics that cycle rainfall absorbed by trees back to the atmosphere for further cycling. Evapotranspiration in coastal forests creates low atmospheric pressure creating a suction effect to draw in water vapour from the ocean. Before the biotic pump was articulated trees were relegated to having a passive role in the water cycle. By contrast those developing the biotic pump concept state that “forest and trees are prime regulators within the water, energy and carbon cycles.”

Development of the theory 

Atmospheric (or flying) rivers are phenomena related to the biotic pump. Originally called tropospheric rivers in 1992, two years later Yong Zhu and Reginald Newall first used the term atmospheric rivers. These aerial rivers distribute rain, enhanced by the biotic pump over large distances. The atmospheric river that flows over the Amazon travels south to provide the River Plate Basin with 50% of its rain. China's north-western rivers receive more than 70% of their precipitation from Euro and Northern Asia. By 2022, 30 years from the first mention of tropospheric rivers in a journal paper, the concept had become widely accepted,  and featured in back-stories to weather events.,

The biotic pump concept is more recent. The first paper naming the biotic pump, authored by Anastassia Makarieva and the late Victor Gorshov was published in 2007, fifteen years after the first mention of tropospheric rivers. These Russian theoretical physicists worked from the Theoretical Physics Division of the Petersberg Nuclear Physics Institute. Dr. Makarieva spent time recreationally and professionally in Russia's northern forests, the largest expanse of trees on the planet. She claims the conventional understanding that winds are driven by differences in air temperature does not fully explain the dynamics of wind, and came to understand that the pressure drop caused by water vapour turning into water was a more accurate model. The 2007 paper was largely ignored but also criticised. Further papers were published to develop the concept , with Dr. Makarieva continuing to write prolifically on the subject often with Brazilian scientist Antonio Nobre.

The theory represents a paradigm shift away from a geo-mechanical view of climate dynamics to include biology as a driver of climate. As such the theory as faced criticism from mainstream climate sciences. Fred Pearce attributes this as being partly cultural. “Science, as I know from forty years of reporting, can be surprisingly tribal. Makarieva and Gorshkov have been outsiders: theoretical physicists in a world of climate science, Russians in a field dominated by Western scientists, and, in Makarieva’s case, a woman too”.

A 2022 article identifies four terrestrial moisture recycling hubs, the Amazon Basin, the Congo Rainforest, South Asia and the Indonesian Archipelago. In particular, the hydrological dynamics of the Amazon Basin are still unclear, but point to the veracity of the biotic pump hypothesis. The authors emphasise that these processes contribute to a “safe operating space for humanity”. Additionally, the biotic pump theory can help explain other natural occurrences around the world. For example, why rainforests such as the Amazon and Congo are able to maintain high rainfall while other unforested biomes decrease in rainfall, as you get further inland.

How the biotic pump drives hydrological processes 

The diagram in this section, from the Journal article  Trees, forests and water: Cool insights for a hot world  outlines the hydrological dynamics that biotic pump drives.

 The cycle begins when precipitation from the ocean is recycled through landscapes by cycles of precipitation and evapotranspiration. Through transpiration and condensation forests create low pressure that draw moist air from the ocean.
 Transpiration and evaporation cycle water back into the atmosphere alongside microbes and volatile organic compounds (VOCs). Airborne microbes nucleate rain.    
 Biologically induced air currents transport atmospheric moisture further inland.
 By providing rainfall vegetation is able to survive and possibly flourish perpetuating forest cover. The forested areas have a more moderate climate through the provision of transpirational cooling and shade. Light penetrating through to the forest floor may be as little as 1% compared to cleared adjacent areas. In areas where more cleared land is exposed conversion of radiant energy to sensible heat increases. Forested areas are significantly cooler than sparsely vegetated or bare earth.
 Trees harvest water by intercepting fog and humid air. Atmospheric humidity condenses on leaves and branches. Biomimicry of this process happens with the use of fog nets.     
 Tree canopies slow the progression of rain to the soil surface and soften the impact. Additionally, through the provision of organic matter and the export of carbon through roots to the mycorrhizal network create soil carbon, enhancing soil structure for the infiltration and storage of water.
 Soils with enhanced infiltration and storage rates mitigate flood impacts. This is further enhanced by forest cover protecting soil from erosion. Water infiltrated into the soil can help to replenish aquifers.

Connection with hydrological cycle and climate moderation 
Of the estimated six trillion trees on the planet, roughly three trillion remain. Along with other terrestrial and marine vegetation they photosynthesise sugars providing a foundational ingredient of life and growth. This process also produces oxygen and removes carbon dioxide from the air.  Trees also provide food and timber, and foster biodiversity. The growing evidence of the biological influences of climate add a further benefit of trees. Forested lands provide ample water for human and animal life, especially in the aptly-named rainforest.

By contrast, drylands comprise approximately 41% of the earth's land area and are home to two billion people. These are fragile ecosystems. Adverse weather patterns and pressure from human activity can quickly deplete water resources.  

Revegetation projects are yielding evidence of how regenerating vegetation restores rainfall. Rajendra Singh, the Waterman of India led a movement that restored several rivers in Rhajastan increasing vegetation cover from 2% to 48%, cooling the region by 2o Celsius, and increasing rainfall., Africa's Great Green Wall project was 15% complete in 2022. Modelling suggests that the completed wall may decrease average temperatures in the Sahel by as much as 1.5o Celsius, but may raise temperatures in the hottest areas. Rainfall would increase, even doubling in some areas.  China also has a 4,500 km Great Green Wall project planted to stop the advancing Gobi Desert.

Alpha Lo coins the term, bio-rain corridor to describe a connected areas of forest maintain the flow of atmospheric moisture flows and precipitation. Continued deforestation poses the risk of disrupting flows of atmospheric moisture. In 2022 there were processes being developed to model the biotic pump mechanism to determine the impact of deforestation and the impacts of discontinuity of forest on atmospheric moisture flows.

David Ellison and co-authors propose a need for greater understanding of these dynamics “Forest-driven water and energy cycles are poorly integrated into regional, national, continental and global decision-making on climate change adaptation, mitigation, land use and water management. This constrains humanity’s ability to protect our planet’s climate and life-sustaining functions.”

See also 

 Biological pump

References 

Atmospheric sciences
Atmospheric circulation